ICE 1 Racing was a team competing in the World Rally Championship with Finnish driver Kimi Räikkönen. The team was based at Citroën Racing's headquarters in Versailles, France.

 Formula One World Champion Räikkönen drove for the Citroën Junior Team in his first World Rally Championship season in 2010. For 2011 the Junior Team was disbanded and Räikkönen was entered for the 2011 season under the Ice 1 Racing name in a Citroën DS3 WRC. Citroën Racing Technologies boss Benoit Nogier remained as Räikkönen's team principal, a role he held at the Citroën Junior Team.

Räikkönen subsequently set up a motocross team using the ICE 1 Racing name. The team is headed by Kari Tiainen and competes in the Motocross World Championship.

Complete WRC results

* Team was not classified having competed in less than two non-European WRC rounds

References

External links

 Ice 1 Racing motorcross team website

World Rally Championship teams
Finnish auto racing teams
Auto racing teams established in 2011